Hapoel Avraham Be'er Sheva was an Israeli football club based in Be'er Sheva. The club served as feeder team for Hapoel Be'er Sheva.

History
The club played in Liga Gimel until it won its division in 1963 and was promoted to third tier Liga Bet. The club played two seasons in Liga Bet, twice finishing third, missing out on promotion by 7 points in each time.

In 1965, the club was merged with Hapoel Dimona after Hapoel Be'er Sheva sold Hapoel Avraham to the municipality of Dimona, appearing as Hapoel Avraham Dimona for the 1964–65 season, but reverting to being named Hapoel Dimona in later seasons.

In 1966, Hapoel Be'er Sheva established an U-20 team and named it Hapoel Avraham Be'er Sheva. The club played in the Youth League, winning the state championship in 1969. In 1970 the youth team's name was changed to Hapoel HaShlosha Be'er Sheva (lit. Hapoel The Three Be'er Sheva), in remembrance of three Be'er Sheva workers who died while working for the team's sponsor, Makhteshim.

Honours

League

See also
Hapoel Be'er Sheva
F.C. Dimona

References

Avraham Be'er Sheva
Sport in Beersheba
1962 establishments in Israel
1965 disestablishments in Israel
Association football clubs established in 1962
Association football clubs disestablished in 1965
Organizations based in Beersheba